The American Library Association's Best Fiction for Young Adults, previously known as Best Books for Young Adults (1966–2010), is a recommendation list of books presented yearly by the YALSA division (Young Adult Library Services Association). It is for "fiction titles published for young adults in the past 16 months that are recommended reading for ages 12 to 18. The purpose of the annual list it to provide librarians and library workers with a resource to use for collection development and readers advisory purposes." In addition there is a "Best of the Best" list of the top 10 titles, made available since 1997. 

The list has been published since 1930 when it was founded as "Best Books for Young People". It has undergone several changes of focus and names over the years, including the "Book Selection Committee" (1954), the "Committee for the Selection of Significant Adult Books for Young People" (1963). It became the "Best Books for Young Adults Committee" (BBYA) in 1966 and then "Best Fiction for Young Adults" in 2010.

Before 1973, only "adult books" (as marketed) were eligible. Books marketed for "young adults" have been considered since then and now constitute a majority of the selections. Meanwhile, the marketing category has changed to include more books oriented to older teens.

Honorees
A list of historical recipients is available in Betty Carter, Best Books for Young Adults, 1st Edition (1994). Later editions of this work (2000 and 2007) contain additional information.

References

External links
Best Fiction for Young Adults, official website
Best Books for Young Adults, official website (award no longer active) 

Awards established in 1930
American children's literary awards
Young adult literature awards
American Library Association awards
English-language literary awards